Riba is a surname. Notable people with this surname include:
 Carles Riba (1893–1959), Catalan poet, writer and translator
 Pau Riba (born 1948), Catalan artist, Carles' grandson
 Dan Riba (born 1960), American television director of animated cartoons
 Marta Riba Carlos (born 1972), Spanish ski mountaineer
 Pere Riba (born 1988), Spanish tennis player
 Tomo Riba (1937–2000), Indian politician

See also
 

Spanish-language surnames